This was the first edition of the tournament.

Hugo Nys and Jan Zieliński won the title after defeating Roman Jebavý and Philipp Oswald 7–6(7–2), 4–6, [10–3] in the final.

Seeds

Draw

References

External links
 Main draw

Challenger di Roseto degli Abruzzi - Doubles